Severn was launched at Bristol in 1806. She spent most of her career as a West Indiaman. In 1813 she ran down and sank another merchantman. In late 1838 Severns crew had to abandon her in the Atlantic in a sinking condition.

Career
Captain Richard Drew acquired a letter of marque on 5 April 1810.

On 11 February 1813 Severn ran down and sank Wargrave.   rescued Wargraves crew. Wargrave, Ostler, master, was on a voyage from Dublin to Surinam. 

Other masters: Christopher Claxton; Gabriel Forster (9 Sept. 1825); Richard Radford (3 Feb. 1831); Thomas Sandon (24 Oct. 1831); Adam Dixon (25 July 1833 (London)); Charles Timothy Stewart (25 Aug. 1834 (London)); Thomas Brown (26 Mar. 1835); Charles Skirling (29 Sept. 1834); Edward Purse (1 May 1837); and William Johns (30 August 1838).

On 10 December 1833 Captain Adam Dixon was sailing by the Chagos Archipelago when he sighted an uncharted island or islands at  that he named Severn Island.

Fate
She was on a voyage from Miramichi, New Brunswick, to Bristol. Russell, of New York, which was sailing from New Orleans to Havre, rescued Severns crew.

Notes, citations, and references
Notes

Citations

References
 

1806 ships
Ships built in Bristol
Age of Sail merchant ships of England
Maritime incidents in 1813
Maritime incidents in 1838